The following street, interurban, or other electric railways operated in California.

East Bay
Alameda, Oakland and Piedmont Railroad
Broadway, Berkeley and Piedmont Street Railroad
Brooklyn and Fruitvale Railroad
Claremont University and Ferris Street Railway
Fourteenth Street Railroad
Highland Park and Fruitvale Railway
Interurban Electric Railway
Key System
Oakland Cable Railway
Oakland Railroad
Oakland and Berkeley Rapid Transit Company
Oakland, Brooklyn and Fruitvale Railroad
Piedmont Cable Company
San Francisco, Oakland & San Jose Consolidated Railway
Alameda County Terminal Railway from part of the Alameda County Railway
East Shore and Suburban Railway
Oakland Traction Company 1906–1912
Berkeley Traction Company
Oakland Traction Consolidated 1904–1906
Oakland Transit Consolidated 1902–1904
Oakland Transit Company 1901
California Railway 1890–1901
Alameda and Oakland Horsecar Railroad 1870–1892
Oakland, Alameda and Laundry Farm Railroad 1888–1890
Alameda County Railway
Central Avenue Railway 1892–1898 narrow gauge Oakland
Central Avenue Railroad 1889–1892 narrow gauge proposed cable
Oakland Consolidated Street Railway
Central Avenue Railway
Piedmont and Mountain View Railway
East Oakland Street Railway
Highland Park and Fruitvale Railroad
Oakland Railroad
Oakland Cable Railway
San Pablo Railroad (San Pablo Avenue Horsecar Railroad)
Oakland, San Leandro and Hayward Electric Railway Consolidated
Oakland, San Leandro and Hayward Electric Railway
Twenty-Third Avenue Electric Railway
Webster Street and Park Railway/Webster and Lake Park Railroad
Shipyard Railway

Los Angeles–San Bernardino

Alhambra and Pasadena Street Railway
Anaheim Street Railway
Central and Boyle Heights Railroad
City Railway (Pasadena)
City Railway (San Bernardino)
Colorado Street Railway
Colton and San Bernardino Railway
Highland Railroad
Lake Shore Electric Railway
Los Angeles Consolidated Electric Railway
Consolidated Electric Railway
Depot Railway of Los Angeles
Electric Rapid Transit Company
Los Angeles Electric Railway
Los Angeles Cable Railway
Los Angeles and Vernon Street Railway
Mateo Street and Santa Fe Avenue Street Car Company
Main Street and Agricultural Park Railroad
Monrovia Street Railway
Orange Grove Street Railroad
Pacific Railway
Pasadena Street Railroad
Redlands Street Railway
Riverside and Arlington Street Railway
San Antonio and Holt Avenue Railroad
San Bernardino, Arrowhead and Waterman Railway
Santa Ana, Orange and Tustin Street Railway
Second Street Cable Railroad
Southern California Motor Road Company
Temple Street Cable Railway
West Pasadena Railway
Los Angeles Railway a narrow gauge interurban
Central Railroad (of California)
City Railroad
Central and Boyle Heights Railroad Horsecar narrow gauge 1885
Spring and West Sixth Street Railroad 1874–1884 Horsecar narrow gauge
Los Angeles and Redondo Railway
Redondo Railway Company
Rosecrans Railroad Company

Pacific Electric Railway
Brooklyn Avenue Railway
East Ninth Street Railway
Los Angeles Inter-Urban Railway
California Pacific Railway narrow gauge 1899–1901 PE's Torrance Line
Los Angeles Traction
Los Angeles and Glendale Railway
California Pacific Railway
Santa Ana and Orange Motor Railway
San Gabriel Rapid Transit Railway
Los Angeles and Pasadena Electric Railway/Los Angeles and Pasadena Railway
Pasadena and Los Angeles Electric Railway
West Pasadena Railway 1887–1894
Colorado Street Railway
Los Angeles and Redondo Railway
Redondo Railway
Redondo and Hermosa Beach Railroad
Los Angeles Pacific Company
Pasadena and Pacific Railway Company of California
Los Angeles County Railroad
Ostrich Farm Railway
Ontario and San Antonio Heights Railway
Pacific Electric Railway Company of Arizona
Pasadena and Mount Lowe Railway/Mount Lowe Railway
Pasadena and Mount Wilson Railway
Redlands Central Railway
Riverside and Arlington Railway
San Bernardino Interurban Railway
San Bernardino Valley Traction
Redlands Street Railway
San Bernardino and Highlands Electric Railway
Santa Ana and Orange Railway
Temple Street Cable Railway/Temple Street Railway narrow gauge 1885–1902
Terracina and Redlands Street Railway narrow gauge Mule Power 1892–1895 Property Sold to PE

Sacramento Valley
Sacramento Northern Railway 1925–1983 (Chico to Sacramento to Oakland after purchase of the Oakland Antioch and Eastern/San Francisco–Sacramento Railroad in 1928.)
Sacramento Northern Railroad 1918–1925 (Chico to Sacramento.) Purchased by WP in 1921.
Northern Electric Railway 1907–1918 (Chico to Sacramento.) Name changed to SN in 1918.
Northern Electric Company 1905–1907
Chico Electric Railway 1904–1905
Marysville and Yuba City Street Railway 1889–1906
Shasta Southern Railway 1905–1907
Vallejo and Northern Railroad 1910–1912
Vallejo and Northern Railway 1909–1910
Sacramento Terminal Company 1908–1918
Northern Electric Railway—Marysville and Colusa Branch 1910–1918
Sacramento and Woodland Railroad 1911–1918
San Francisco–Sacramento Railroad 1920–1928
Oakland, Antioch and Eastern Railway 1911–1920
Sacramento Valley West Side Electric Railway 1915–1917 Dixon
Oakland and Antioch Railway 1909–1911
West Side Railroad 1911–1921 proposed to build to Rio Vista
Woodland Street Railway

San Diego

Coronado Railroad
Electric Rapid Transit Street Car Company
Los Angeles and San Diego Beach Railway
National City Street Car Company
San Diego Cable Railway
San Diego Electric Railway
San Diego Street Car Company
San Diego Street Railway
San Diego and Old Town Street Railway
San Diego, Old Town and Pacific Beach Railroad
San Diego and Pacific Beach Railway
San Diego, Pacific Beach and La Jolla Railway

San Francisco

San Jose

Interurban Railways
Peninsular Railway Company
Peninsular Railroad
San Jose-Los Gatos Interurban Railway Company
Santa Clara Interurban Railroad

Streetcar Companies
San Jose Railroads
San Jose and Santa Clara County Railway
Alum Rock Railway Company
San Jose and Alum Rock Park Motor Company
First Street and San Pedro Street Railroad
First Street and Willow Glen Railroad
North Side Horse Railroad
People's Railroad
South East Side Horse Railroad Company<!-–?-->
San Jose Railway Company
San Jose Railroad Company
Willow Glen Railroad Company

Other cities and towns
Bakersfield
Bakersfield and Kern Electric Railway

Eureka
Eureka Street Railroad

Fresno
Fresno Railroad
Fresno City Railway
Fresno City, Belmont and Yosemite Railroad
Fresno Traction Company

North Bay Area
San Francisco and Napa Valley Railroad abandoned, in phases during period 1938–1956
San Francisco, Napa and Calistoga Railway 1911–1936 electric interurban Napa city to Calistoga.
San Francisco, Vallejo and Napa Valley Railroad 1906–1911
Vallejo, Benicia and Napa Valley Railroad 1902–1910
Santa Rosa Railroad 1903–1923 (Later Northwestern Pacific Railroad part of SP)
Santa Rosa Street Railway (Later Petaluma and Santa Rosa Railroad)
Union Street Railway narrow gauge (Sonoma County) 1893–1897
South Side Street Railway/South Side Railway narrow gauge Horsecar 1888–1893

Paso Robles
Paso Robles Street Railway

Sacramento
Central Electric Railway
Central Street Railway
Highland Park Railway
Sacramento City Street Railroad
Sacramento Valley Electric Railroad

San Luis Obispo
San Luis Street Railway
San Luis Obispo Street Railway

Santa Barbara
Santa Barbara Street Railroad
Santa Barbara and Citizens' Street Railroad

Santa Cruz County
Pacific Avenue Street Railroad (1876 – 1892)
City Railroad (1877 – 1881)
East Santa Cruz Street Railroad (1889 – 1902)
Santa Cruz, Garfield Park and Capitola Electric Railway (1891 – 1892)
Santa Cruz Electric Railway (1892 – 1904)
Santa Cruz, Capitola and Watsonville Railway (1902 – 1904)
Watsonville Transportation Company (1903 – 1907)
Union Traction Company (1904 – 1926)
Watsonville Railway and Navigation Company (1911 – 1914)

Santa Rosa
Santa Rosa Street Railway
South Side Street Railway

Stockton
Stockton Electric Motor Railway
California Midland Railroad (of 1905) Marysville
California Terminal Company 1911
Lakeport and Richardson's Bay Railroad
Central California Traction Route downtown Sacramento to Stockton and competed directly with SP and WP between the two cities. Later owned by WP. Converted to diesel. Currently an active Class III freight railroad. Trackage in rural Sacramento County in year 1995 was in nearly inoperable condition. Electric interurban operation ended in 1933.Stockton Electric Railway 1881/1891–1905
Stockton Street Railway 1874–1881/1891 horsecar
Stockton Terminal and Eastern Railroad now a freight railroad, 1908–present
 Tidewater Southern Railway (TS) Stockton to Modesto. Later owned by WP and electric operation converted to diesel. Still active trackage.
Tidewater and Southern Transit Company 1912Tidewater and Southern Railroad 1910–1912Various
Glendale and Montrose Railway
Holton Interurban Railway later SPModesto Interurban Railway 1909–1911 later METMonterey, Fresno and Eastern Railroad
Mount Tamalpais and Muir Woods Railway abandoned 1930Mill Valley and Mount Tamalpais Scenic Railway 1896–1913
Nevada County Traction Company
Orange Grove Street Railway 1888–1896
Second Street Railroad narrow gauge horsecar Pomona
Pacific Gas and Electric Company
West Sacramento Electric Company 1914 (proposed)
Second Street Cable Railway closed in 1890Shasta Springs Scenic Railroad 1888 cable
Sierra Madre Street Railway 1887–1890/1891 narrow gauge Mule car Los Angeles
South Beach and Mission Railway c. 1862 San Francisco
Southern California Motor Road Company narrow gauge 1886–1892 leased to SP San Bernardino-Colton
Southern California Rapid Transit District Metro Rail 1975–1986 now part of Los Angeles Metro Rail
Tuscan Mineral Springs Corporation Electric Railway 1903–? Red Bluff–Tuscan Springs
Ventura and Ojai Railway 1887 - connected to SP coastal line and owned by SP soon afterwards. Abandoned and railbanked in two sections: Ojai Valley Trail and Ventura River Trail.
Visalia and Tulare Railroad abandoned 1900Visalia Electric Railroad 1904–1992, to SP in 1992.
Chowchilla Pacific Railway
Volcano Northern Railroad 1903 (Amador County)
Visalia Rail Road to SP in 1899West Coast Land Company aka San Luis Street Railway narrow gauge horsecar 1890–1906
San Luis Obispo Street Railway

Proposed lines
Bakersfield and Ventura Railway Electric 1902
Bay and Coast Railway 1899 narrow gauge Electric & Common Carrier
Bay Counties Electric Railroad 1905–1907
Bay Counties Power Company Electric 1902
Benicia Land and Terminal Railway 1914 Electric
Big Four Electric Railway 1912–1914
California Electric Railway 1909
California Pacific Railroad (of 1901) Los Angeles–San Pedro
California Rapid Transit Railroad 1907 San Francisco–San Jose–Monterey & San Jose–Martinez
California Terminal Railway 1914–1915/1916 San Francisco-Marin/Sonoma/Napa/Yolo/Sacramento Counties
Sausalito Incline Street Railway 1914 Cable/Electric Sausalito
Scotts Creek Railway 1908 Santa Cruz County
Sierra County Railroad 1911 Sacramento–Sierra
Sonoma and Lake County Electric Railway Lakeport–Cloverdale 1907
Sonoma and Lake County Railroad (of 1907) Lakeport–Cloverdale
Highland Pacific Railroad 1909
Sonoma and Lake County Railway 1909 Lakeport–Cloverdale–Preston
Southern California Beach Railway 1912–1914 Colton–San Diego
Stockton and Bay City Short Line Railroad 1911–1912 Stockton–Byron–Antioch–Oakland
Stockton and Lodi Terminal Railroad 1895 Stockton–Lodi
Tidewater Northern Railway 1909–1910 Santa Monica–Ventura
Tulare County Power Company 1911–1912
Turlock Traction Company 1911 Turlock–Denair
Union Belt Railway 1906 Sacramento
University Heights Motor Road 1886–1888 San Diego
Vallejo Traction Company 1910 Vallejo
Valley Railroad 1912 Red Bluff–Woodland–Davis–Dixon to connect with Oakland, Antioch and Eastern Railway
Ventura Terminal Railway 1907/1908
Yosemite Park Electric Railway 1904
Yucaipa and Oak Glen Railroad 1908 Standard or narrow gauge Electric Yucaipa–Redlands

References

Bibliography

Henry V. Poor,  Manual of the Railroads of the United States, 1889, appendix, pp. 38–41Poor's Manual of Railroads, Poor's Directory of Railroad Officials and Manual of American Street Railways, August 1890, pp. 1183–1187Poor's Railroad Manual'', Poor's Directory of Railroad Officials, 1892, pp. 249–254

Passenger rail transportation in California
Interurban railways in California
 Street
California
Street railroad